Exum may refer to:

People
 Andrew Exum, American scholar of the Middle East
 Antone Exum, American musician and former American football safety
 Benjamin Exum, member of the North Carolina General Assembly of 1778
 Cecil Exum (born 1962), American–Australian basketball player
 Culpepper Exum, mayor of Birmingham, Alabama from 1910-1913
 Dante Exum (born 1995), Australian basketball player (son of Cecil)
 Glenn Exum, American mountain climber
 J. Cheryl Exum, biblical scholar
 James G. Exum, American jurist who served on the North Carolina Supreme Court
 Nathaniel Exum, American politician in the Maryland Senate

Other uses
 Exum Glacier, Antarctica
 Exum Ridge, a prominent rock buttress on the Grand Teton in Wyoming
 Exum Mountain Guides, a mountain guide service based in Wyoming

See also
 Exuma (disambiguation)